Hovås Billdal IF is a Swedish football club located in Hovås, Göteborg.

Background
Hovås Billdal IF currently plays in Division 4 Göteborg B which is the sixth tier of Swedish football. They play their home matches at the Hovåsvallen in Hovås.

The club is affiliated to Göteborgs Fotbollförbund. Hovås IF have competed in the Svenska Cupen on 21 occasions and have played 52 matches in the competition.

Season to season

In their most successful period Hovås IF competed in the following divisions:

In recent seasons Hovås Billdal IF have competed in the following divisions:

Footnotes

External links
 Hovås Billdal IF – Official website
 Hovås Billdal IF on Facebook

Football clubs in Gothenburg
Association football clubs established in 1943
1943 establishments in Sweden
Football clubs in Västra Götaland County